Arino (Meadow Mari: , Aryn) is a village in Morkinsky District, Mari El Republic, Russia.

There were 220 inhabitants in 2003, and 239 in 2010.

Notable people 
 Sergei Chavain (1888–1937), Mari poet and playwright, was the school headmaster in Aryn
 Olyk Ipai (1912–1937), Mari poet, attended school in Aryn

References

Urban-type settlements in the Mari El Republic